Clean is a general-purpose purely functional computer programming language. It was called the Concurrent Clean System, then the Clean System, later just Clean. Clean has been developed by a group of researchers from the Radboud University in Nijmegen since 1987.

Features
The language Clean first appeared in 1987. Although development of the language itself has slowed down, some researchers are still working in the language. In 2018, a spin-off company was founded that uses Clean as well.

Clean shares many properties and syntax with a younger sibling language, Haskell:
referential transparency, list comprehension, guards, garbage collection, higher order functions, currying and lazy evaluation. However, Clean deals with mutable state and I/O through a uniqueness typing system, in contrast to Haskell's use of monads. The compiler takes advantage of the uniqueness type system to generate more efficient code, because it knows that at any point during the execution of the program, only one reference can exist to a value with a unique type. Therefore, a unique value can be changed in place.

An integrated development environment (IDE) for Microsoft Windows is included in the Clean distribution.

Examples
Hello world:
 Start = "Hello, world!"
Factorial:

Fibonacci sequence:

Infix operator:
(^) infixr 8 :: Int Int -> Int
(^) x 0 = 1
(^) x n = x * x ^ (n-1)
The type declaration states that the function is a right associative infix operator with priority 8: this states that x*x^(n-1) is equivalent to x*(x^(n-1)) as opposed to (x*x)^(n-1). This operator is  pre-defined in StdEnv, the Clean standard library.

How Clean works
Computation is based on graph rewriting and reduction. Constants such as numbers are graphs and functions are graph rewriting formulas. This, combined with compilation to native code, makes Clean programs which use high abstraction run relatively fast according to the Computer Language Benchmarks Game.

Compiling
 Source files (.icl) and definition files (.dcl) are translated into Core Clean, a basic variant of Clean, in Clean.
 Core clean is converted into Clean's platform-independent intermediate language (.abc), implemented in C and Clean.
 Intermediate ABC code is converted to object code (.o) using C.
 Object code is linked with other files in the module and the runtime system and converted into a normal executable using the system linker (when available) or a dedicated linker written in Clean on Windows.

Earlier Clean system versions were written completely in C, thus avoiding bootstrapping issues.

The SAPL system compiles Core Clean to JavaScript and does not use ABC code.

The ABC machine 
To close the gap between Core Clean, a high-level functional language, and machine code, the ABC machine is used.
This is an imperative abstract graph rewriting machine.
Generating concrete machine code from abstract ABC code is a relatively small step, so by using the ABC machine it is much easier to target multiple architectures for code generation.

The ABC machine has an uncommon memory model. It has a graph store to hold the Clean graph that is being rewritten. The A(rgument)-stack holds arguments that refer to nodes in the graph store. This way, a node's arguments can be rewritten, which is needed for pattern matching. The B(asic value)-stack holds basic values (integers, characters, reals, etc.). While not strictly necessary (all these elements could be nodes in the graph store as well), using a separate stack is much more efficient. The C(ontrol)-stack holds return addresses for flow control.

The runtime system, which is linked into every executable, has a print rule which prints a node to the output channel. When a program is executed, the Start node is printed. For this, it has to be rewritten to root normal form, after which its children are rewritten to root normal form, etc., until the whole node is printed.

Platforms
Clean is available for Microsoft Windows (IA-32 and X86-64), macOS (X86-64), and Linux (IA-32, X86-64, and AArch64).

Some libraries are not available on all platforms, like ObjectIO which is only available on Windows. Also the feature to write dynamics to files is only available on Windows.

The availability of Clean per platform varies with each version:

Comparison to Haskell

A 2008 benchmark showed that Clean native code performs roughly equally well as Haskell (GHC), depending on the benchmark.

Syntactic differences
The syntax of Clean is very similar to that of Haskell, with some notable differences:

In general, Haskell has introduced more syntactic sugar than Clean.

References

External links
Clean Wiki
clean-lang.org: public registry with Clean packages
cloogle.org: a search engine to search in Clean packages

Functional languages
Term-rewriting programming languages
Free compilers and interpreters
Cross-platform free software
Programming languages created in 1987